Howard Davis is the name of:

Howard Davis (professor of architecture), American writer and professor of architecture at the University of Oregon
Howard Davis (musician) (1940–2008), British violinist
Howard Davis (sprinter) (born 1967), Jamaican athlete 
Howard Davis (chemical engineer) (1937–2009), American chemical engineer
Howard Davis (field hockey) (born 1932), British Olympic hockey player
Howard Davis Jr. (1956–2015), American amateur and professional boxer, won Olympic gold, 1976
Howard McParlin Davis (1918–1994), American professor of art history at Columbia University
Howard W. Davis (1885–1959), member of the California State Assembly and the Los Angeles City Council
Howard Stratton Davis (1885–?), English architect
H-Bomb Davis (Howard Davis, born 1971), drummer, member of the alternative band Evans Blue

See also
Howard Davies (disambiguation)